Clarence Byron "C. B." Dollaway (born August 10, 1983) is an American mixed martial artist currently fighting in the Light Heavyweight division. A professional since 2006, he formerly fought in the UFC and was a finalist on SpikeTV's The Ultimate Fighter 7.

Early life
Dollaway graduated from Northmor High School near Galion, Ohio where he was a state champion wrestler in the 171 lb weight class. After high school Dollaway attended Colby Community College in Colby, Kansas. While at Colby, Dollaway won the JUCO National Championships. Soon after, Dollaway moved to Tempe, Arizona to attend Arizona State University where he earned a bachelor's degree in interdisciplinary studies with a concentration in sociology and justice studies. Wrestling since the age of five, Dollaway continued the sport at Arizona State University, earning All-American status in 2006, taking 5th place in the 184 lb. bracket as a tenth seed.

Dollaway left Arizona Combat Sports to train at Power MMA and Fitness with The Ultimate Fighter 8 Light Heavyweight winner Ryan Bader.

Mixed martial arts career

The Ultimate Fighter
Dollaway appeared on the seventh season of the reality television series The Ultimate Fighter. He earned a spot on the show when he defeated David Baggett by TKO. Rampage Jackson won the initial coin toss and decided to pick the first fighter, Dollaway. Dollaway did not have his first fight until the last preliminary fight, going up against Nick Klein. Dollaway defeated Klein by guillotine choke in the second round. Dollaway then went on to fight Cale Yarbrough in the quarter-finals. Dollaway won the fight by TKO in the first round. Dollaway's next opponent was the future winner of the show Amir Sadollah, Sadollah won by an armbar submission in the third round. After Jesse Taylor was forced out of the show, Dana White needed someone to fight Sadollah in the finale. Dollaway and Tim Credeur fought to see who would be in the finale. After three rounds, Dollaway won by unanimous decision. Sadollah defeated Dollaway for the second time by armbar to win the show. Although it appeared that Dollaway had tapped, shortly after the fight he proclaimed he did not in fact tap, which Joe Rogan disputed.

Ultimate Fighting Championship
Following up on his loss at The Ultimate Finale, where he was runner-up, he was offered a fight against fighter Jesse Taylor at UFC Fight Night: Silva vs. Irvin where he won by Peruvian necktie in the first round. This was the first time in UFC history this submission was successfully used and earned Dollaway Submission of the Night honors.

At UFC 92, Dollaway returned to action, for his eighth fight of 2008, against Mike Massenzio, a fighter who he had formerly defeated in his Junior College wrestling career. Dollaway defeated Massenzio by TKO due to punches at 3:01 of the first round. After being stunned by a Massenzio punch and nearly being caught in a guillotine choke, Dollaway secured top position, took Massenzio's back and pounded his opponent with punches until the referee halted the bout. After the stoppage Dollaway celebrated with a howl similar to that of his coach on The Ultimate Fighter, Quinton Jackson. Massenzio later stated that Dollaway tapped out during their match.

Dollaway had his fourth fight for the UFC taking on Tom Lawlor at UFC 100 on the preliminary card. In the beginning of the bout, Dollaway shot in for a takedown but was quickly ensnared in a guillotine choke. Lawlor tightly locked the hold, and moments later Lawlor looked up to the ref stating Dollaway had lost consciousness, ending the bout 55 seconds into the first round.

He was scheduled to fight Dan Miller on September 16, 2009, at UFC Fight Night 19. However, Miller got an infection and had to withdraw. Newcomer Jay Silva was named as his replacement. Dollaway outwrestled Silva for three rounds, winning a unanimous decision.

Dollaway next faced Goran Reljic on February 21, 2010, at UFC 110. Dollaway was able to win via unanimous decision, with all three judges scoring the bout 29–28.

Dollaway faced Joe Doerksen on September 25, 2010, at UFC 119.  Dollaway defeated Doerksen by modified guillotine choke at 2:47 of the opening frame. In this bout, Dollaway showed exceptional grappling skills, locking on to an arm in guillotine and trying to submit his opponent. Then a scrambled ensued, with Dollaway switching to a Peruvian Necktie choke from the mount and forcing Doerksen to tap. He was awarded his second Submission of the Night award for this victory.

Dollaway faced Mark Muñoz on March 3, 2011, at UFC Live: Sanchez vs. Kampmann and lost by KO for the first time in his career at only 54 seconds of the first round.

Dollaway was defeated via second-round TKO by Jared Hamman on August 14, 2011, at UFC on Versus 5.

Dollaway faced Jason Miller on May 26, 2012, at UFC 146. He weathered the striking of Miller at the beginning of each round and used his wrestling and ground and pound to control the latter part of the rounds, en route to a unanimous decision victory.  In a post-fight interview, with Ariel Helwani, Dollaway stated that he was happy with his performance, and that the win was big for his career. However, many fans were disappointed with Dollaway for having held Mayhem down for almost the entirety of the fight without having mounted much offense.

Dollaway defeated Daniel Sarafian on January 19, 2013, at UFC on FX: Belfort vs. Bisping. The exciting three round affair earned both fighters the 'Fight of the Night' bonus.

Dollaway was expected to face Cezar Ferreira on May 18, 2013, at UFC on FX 8.  However, Dollaway pulled out of the bout citing an injury and was replaced by Chris Camozzi.

Dollaway faced Tim Boetsch on October 19, 2013, at UFC 166, replacing an injured Luke Rockhold. While Dollaway seemingly controlled the action for the majority of the bout, he was docked a point for multiple eye pokes to Boetsch and lost the fight via split decision.

A bout with Cezar Ferreira eventually took place on March 23, 2014, at UFC Fight Night 38. Dollaway won the fight via KO in the first round.

Dollaway faced Francis Carmont on May 31, 2014, at UFC Fight Night 41. He won the fight by unanimous decision.  The win also earned Dollaway his first Performance of the Night bonus award. This also marks the first time the UFC promotion has given a Performance of the Night bonus to a fighter who won their fight by decision.

Dollaway faced Lyoto Machida on December 20, 2014, at UFC Fight Night 58. He lost via TKO in the first round.

Dollaway faced Michael Bisping on April 25, 2015, at UFC 186. Despite dropping Bisping in the first round, Dollaway lost the fight by unanimous decision.

Dollaway next faced Nate Marquardt on December 19, 2015, at UFC on Fox 17. After a back-and-forth first round, Dollaway lost the fight via knockout in the second round.

Dollaway was expected to face Francimar Barroso in a light heavyweight bout on September 10, 2016, at UFC 203. However, on the day of the event, Dollaway suffered a back injury at his hotel due to a malfunctioning elevator and was unable to participate. As a result, Barroso was also removed from the event.

After nineteen months away from competition, Dollaway faced Ed Herman on July 7, 2017, at The Ultimate Fighter 25 Finale. He won the back-and-forth bout via unanimous decision.

Dollaway returned to middleweight and faced Héctor Lombard on March 3, 2018, at UFC 222. Dollaway won the fight after Lombard clearly landed two intentional strikes to Dollaway after the end of the first round, knocking him down. Lombard was disqualified and Dollaway was given the victory whilst outside the octagon.

Dollaway was scheduled to face Omari Akhmedov on September 15, 2018, at UFC Fight Night 136. However, Akhmedov pulled out of the fight in early September and was briefly replaced by promotional newcomer Artem Frolov. In turn, after just three days, Frolov backed out of the fight citing lingering injuries, and he was replaced by Khalid Murtazaliev. Dollaway lost the fight via TKO at the end of the second round.

On August 16, 2019, it was reported that Dollaway tested positive for anastrozole, a growth hormone releasing peptide 2 (GHRP-2 or pralmorelin); a metabolite of GHRP-2; and GHRP-6, on a sample collected on December 19, 2018. In addition, tested positive for clomiphene on an out-of-competition sample collected on February 9, 2019. Dollaway also tested positive for receiving intravenous (IV) infusion over the allowable limits on December, 2018. As a result, Dollaway was suspended for 2 years by USADA retroactive from December 13, 2018, becoming eligible to fight again on December 13, 2020. Dollaway indicated that he was unknowingly in contact with the substance from a stem cell procedure done in Mexico. In December 2019, news surfaced that after a 20-fight tenure Dollaway and the UFC had parted ways.

Post-UFC career
Dollaway challenged Jiří Procházka for the Rizin Light Heavyweight Championship at Rizin 20 on December 31, 2019. After a series of successful low kicks, Dollaway got caught by punches and lost the fight via knockout in the first round.

Lawsuit against Endeavor
On June 24, 2021, news surfaced that Dollaway and Kajan Johnson had filed a lawsuit in Nevada Federal District Court against Endeavor, the parent company of the UFC. The plaintiffs allege that Zuffa violated antitrust laws by engaging in several anti-competitive practices.

Championships and accomplishments

Amateur wrestling
USA Wrestling
Cliff Keen Las Vegas Invitational 184 lb: Runner-up out of Arizona State University (2004)
Reno Tournament of Champions 184 lb: Runner-up out of Arizona State University (2004)
National Collegiate Athletic Association
NCAA Division I All-American out of Arizona State University (2006)
NCAA Division I 184 lb: 5th place out of Arizona State University (2006)
Pac-10 Conference 184 lb: Runner-up out of Arizona State University (2004–05)
National Junior College Athletic Association
NJCAA Division I All-American out of Colby Community College (2003–04)
NJCAA Division I 184 lb: Champion out of Colby Community College (2003)
NJCAA Division I 184 lb: 3rd place out of Colby Community College (2004)
National High School Coaches Association
High School All-American (2002)
NHSCA Senior National 171 lb: 4th place out of Northmor High School (2002)
Ohio High School Athletic Association
Ohio State Wrestling Champion out of Northmor High School (2002)

Mixed martial arts
Ultimate Fighting Championship
Fight of the Night (one time) vs. Daniel Sarafian
Performance of the Night (one time) vs. Francis Carmont
Submission of the Night (two times) vs. Jesse Taylor and Joe Doerksen

Mixed martial arts record

|-
|Loss
|align=center|17–10
|Jiří Procházka
|KO (punches)
|Rizin 20
|
|align=center|1
|align=center|1:55
|Saitama, Japan
|
|-
|Loss
|align=center|17–9
|Khalid Murtazaliev
|TKO (referee stoppage)
|UFC Fight Night: Hunt vs. Oleinik 
|
|align=center|2
|align=center|5:00
|Moscow, Russia
|
|-
|Win
|align=center|17–8
|Héctor Lombard
|DQ (illegal punches)
|UFC 222 
|
|align=center|1
|align=center|5:00
|Las Vegas, Nevada, United States
|
|-
|Win
|align=center|16–8
|Ed Herman
|Decision (unanimous)
|The Ultimate Fighter: Redemption Finale
|
|align=center|3
|align=center|5:00
|Las Vegas, Nevada, United States
|
|-
|Loss
|align=center|15–8
|Nate Marquardt
|KO (punch)
|UFC on Fox: dos Anjos vs. Cowboy 2 
|
|align=center|2
|align=center|0:28
|Orlando, Florida, United States
|
|-
|Loss
|align=center| 15–7
|Michael Bisping
|Decision (unanimous)
|UFC 186
|
|align=center|3
|align=center|5:00
|Montreal, Quebec, Canada
|
|-
| Loss
|align=center| 15–6
|Lyoto Machida
|TKO (body kick and punches)
|UFC Fight Night: Machida vs. Dollaway
|
|align=center|1
|align=center|1:02
|Barueri, Brazil
|
|-
|Win
|align=center| 15–5
|Francis Carmont
|Decision (unanimous)
|UFC Fight Night: Muñoz vs. Mousasi
|
|align=center|3
|align=center|5:00
|Berlin, Germany
|
|-
| Win
|align=center| 14–5
|Cezar Ferreira
|KO (punches)
|UFC Fight Night: Shogun vs. Henderson 2
|
|align=center|1
|align=center|0:39
|Natal, Brazil
|
|-
|Loss
|align=center| 13–5
|Tim Boetsch
|Decision (split)
|UFC 166
|
|align=center| 3
|align=center| 5:00
|Houston, Texas, United States
| 
|-
|Win
|align=center| 13–4
|Daniel Sarafian
|Decision (split)
|UFC on FX: Belfort vs. Bisping
|
|align=center| 3
|align=center| 5:00
|São Paulo, Brazil
|
|-
|Win
|align=center| 12–4
|Jason Miller
|Decision (unanimous)
|UFC 146
|
|align=center| 3
|align=center| 5:00
|Las Vegas, Nevada, United States
| 
|-
|Loss
|align=center| 11–4
|Jared Hamman
|TKO (punches)
|UFC Live: Hardy vs. Lytle
|
|align=center| 2
|align=center| 3:38
|Milwaukee, Wisconsin, United States
| 
|-
|Loss
|align=center| 11–3
|Mark Muñoz
|KO (punches)
|UFC Live: Sanchez vs. Kampmann
|
|align=center| 1
|align=center| 0:54
|Louisville, Kentucky, United States
| 
|-
|Win
|align=center| 11–2
|Joe Doerksen
|Submission (guillotine choke)
|UFC 119
|
|align=center| 1
|align=center| 2:13
|Indianapolis, Indiana, United States
| 
|-
|Win
|align=center| 10–2
|Goran Reljić
|Decision (unanimous)
|UFC 110
|
|align=center| 3
|align=center| 5:00
|Sydney, Australia
| 
|-
|Win
|align=center| 9–2
|Jay Silva
| Decision (unanimous)
|UFC Fight Night: Diaz vs. Guillard
|
|align=center| 3
|align=center| 5:00
|Oklahoma City, Oklahoma, United States
| 
|-
|Loss
|align=center| 8–2
|Tom Lawlor
|Technical Submission (guillotine choke)
|UFC 100
|
|align=center| 1
|align=center| 0:55
|Las Vegas, Nevada, United States
| 
|-
|Win
|align=center| 8–1
|Mike Massenzio
|TKO (punches)
|UFC 92
|
|align=center| 1
|align=center| 3:01
|Las Vegas, Nevada, United States
| 
|-
| Win
|align=center| 7–1
|Jesse Taylor
|Submission (Peruvian necktie)
|UFC Fight Night: Silva vs. Irvin
|
|align=center| 1
|align=center| 3:58
|Las Vegas, Nevada, United States
| 
|-
| Loss
|align=center| 6–1
|Amir Sadollah
|Submission (armbar)
|The Ultimate Fighter: Team Rampage vs. Team Forrest Finale
|
|align=center| 1
|align=center| 3:02
|Las Vegas, Nevada, United States
| 
|-
|Win
|align=center| 6–0
|Bill Smallwood
|Submission (rear-naked choke)
|SE: Vale Tudo
|
|align=center| 1
|align=center| N/A
|Mexico
| 
|-
|Win
|align=center| 5–0
|Hans Marrero
|TKO (knee and punches)
|HDNet Fights 1
|
|align=center| 1
|align=center| 1:07
|Dallas, Texas, United States
| 
|-
|Win
|align=center| 4–0
|Joe Bunch
|TKO (punches)
|IFO: Wiuff vs. Salmon
|
|align=center| 2
|align=center| 4:31
|Las Vegas, Nevada, United States
| 
|-
|Win
|align=center| 3–0
|George Hartman
|Decision (unanimous)
|Rage in the Cage 94
|
|align=center| 3
|align=center| 3:00
|Phoenix, Arizona, United States
| 
|-
|Win
|align=center| 2–0
|Levi LaLonde
|TKO (punches)
|WFC: Desert Storm
|
|align=center| 1
|align=center| 2:40
|Camp Verde, Arizona, United States
| 
|-
|Win
|align=center| 1–0
|Chuck Pablo
|TKO (slam)
|Cage Fighting Federation
|
|align=center| 1
|align=center| 0:17
|Albuquerque, New Mexico, United States
|

Mixed martial arts exhibition record

|Win
| align=center| 4–1
| Tim Credeur
| Decision (unanimous)
| The Ultimate Fighter: Team Rampage vs. Team Forrest
|  (airdate)
| align=center| 3
| align=center| 5:00
| Las Vegas, Nevada, United States
| 
|-
| Loss
| align=center| 3–1
| Amir Sadollah
| Submission (armbar)
| The Ultimate Fighter: Team Rampage vs. Team Forrest
|  (airdate)
| align=center| 3
| align=center| 2:50
| Las Vegas, Nevada, United States
| 
|-
| Win
| align=center| 3–0
| Cale Yarbrough
| TKO (punches)
| The Ultimate Fighter: Team Rampage vs. Team Forrest
|  (airdate)
| align=center| 1
| align=center| 2:43
| Las Vegas, Nevada, United States
| 
|-
| Win
| align=center| 2–0
| Nick Klein
| Submission (guillotine choke)
| The Ultimate Fighter: Team Rampage vs. Team Forrest
|  (airdate)
| align=center| 2
| align=center| 2:41
| Las Vegas, Nevada, United States
| 
|-
| Win
| align=center| 1–0
| David Baggett
| TKO (punches)
| The Ultimate Fighter: Team Rampage vs. Team Forrest
|  (airdate)
| align=center| 1
| align=center| 1:29
| Las Vegas, Nevada, United States
| 
|-

See also
 List of current UFC fighters
 List of male mixed martial artists

References

External links
Official website

C.B. Dollaway's profile at the National Wrestling Hall of Fame
Official UFC Profile

1983 births
Living people
American male mixed martial artists
Mixed martial artists from Michigan
Middleweight mixed martial artists
Mixed martial artists utilizing collegiate wrestling
Mixed martial artists utilizing Brazilian jiu-jitsu
Arizona State University alumni
American male sport wrestlers
People from Calhoun County, Michigan
Sportspeople from Battle Creek, Michigan
Ultimate Fighting Championship male fighters
American practitioners of Brazilian jiu-jitsu
People awarded a black belt in Brazilian jiu-jitsu